Small Talk is the debut extended play by British singer, songwriter and record producer MNEK. It was released on 20 March 2015 through Virgin EMI Records. The extended came after his breakthrough producing career, working with the likes of The Saturdays, Duke Dumont and Little Mix, and his featured appearance with Gorgon City on their 2013 single, entitled "Ready for Your Love".

Track listing
All tracks produced solely by MNEK, except "Every Little Word", which was produced alongside Quintin Christian.

References

 
2015 debut EPs
MNEK albums
Albums produced by MNEK